Franktown is an unincorporated town, a post office, and a census-designated place (CDP) located in and governed by Douglas County, Colorado, United States. The CDP is a part of the Denver–Aurora–Lakewood, CO Metropolitan Statistical Area. The Franktown post office has the ZIP Code 80116. At the United States Census 2010, the population of the Franktown CDP was 395, while the population of the 80116 ZIP Code Tabulation Area was 3,942 including adjacent areas. Douglas County governs the unincorporated town.

History
Franktown is named for Hon. J. Frank Gardner, an early resident. Franktown was the first county seat of Douglas County, serving in this role from 1861 until 1863.  James Frank Gardner, a would-be gold miner who built a squatter's cabin four miles north of here in 1859. A popular rest stop on the busy Jimmy Camp Trail (which followed Cherry Creek into Denver), "Frank's Town" was designated the seat of Douglas County in 1861; the settlement moved to its current location two years later. Though railroads made the trail obsolete after 1870, and the county offices moved to Castle Rock in 1874, Franktown remained a ranching and farming hub, held together by its church, school, grange, and handful of businesses. It never incorporated, and during the twentieth century no more than a hundred people called it home, but that's how the locals liked it. Even as suburban sprawl surrounded it in the 1990s, Franktown resisted efforts to develop, maintaining a distinctly rural identity.

The Grange Franktown's strong agricultural roots made it a natural fit for the grange, a cooperative farmers' movement that swept rural America in the mid-1870s. Several dozen chapters formed in Colorado, including the Fonder Grange (founded near here in 1875) and its successor, Pikes Peak Grange No. 163 (established in Franktown in 1908). Both belonged to the statewide grange organization, which set up credit unions, insurance programs, and other services, and to the national grange association, which pursued long-range political goals. But it was the local chapters that really affected farmers' lives. The dances, holiday picnics, and town meetings they sponsored helped sparsely populated communities forge a sense of identity. Still active today, Pike's Peak Grange No. 163 in Franktown is listed on the National Register of Historic Places.

Castlewood Dam collapse

From the day it opened, Castlewood Dam was a catastrophe waiting to happen. Built in 1890, about five miles south of here on Cherry Creek, the barrier stored enough water to irrigate 30,000 acres of farmland-or would have, if it hadn't leaked so badly. The seeping began the year the dam was completed and was serious enough that a hundred-foot section crumbled in 1897. Although its builders vouched for the structure's integrity, the dam continued to leak sporadically for decades. Finally, on August 3, 1933, the inevitable happened: Castlewood collapsed, sending a billion-gallon torrent toward Denver. Only two people drowned, thanks to a switchboard operator's life-saving calls, but the flood devastated farms in this area and tore out six bridges in Denver, thirty miles downstream. The dam's remains can still be visited in nearby Castlewood Canyon State Park.

Timber industry

Frontier travelers often rejoiced upon reaching the timbered ridge just south of Franktown; it was the first woodland they encountered after hundreds of miles on the prairies. Early settlers in Colorado appreciated the forest, too-as a source of building material. Known as "the Pinery," it provided fast-growing Denver and other towns with most of their lumber during the 1860s. Several sawmills buzzed nonstop in and around Franktown, barely able to keep up with the demand. In the early 1870s, the Pinery supplied railroad ties to the Kansas Pacific and Denver & Rio Grande, both of which were laying tracks within twenty-five miles of here. Those routes eventually opened larger forests to exploitation and helped bring down this region's timber industry. By 1880, Franktown's sawmills had gone silent, but they had already left their mark: Pinery lumber built much of early Colorado.

Geography
Colorado State Highways 83 and 86 intersect in the center of Franktown. SH 83 leads north  to Parker and south  to Colorado Springs, while SH 86 leads east  to Elizabeth and west  to Castle Rock, the Douglas County seat.

Demographics

Education
The Douglas County School District serves Franktown.

See also

Outline of Colorado
Index of Colorado-related articles
State of Colorado
Colorado cities and towns
Colorado census designated places
Colorado counties
Douglas County, Colorado
List of statistical areas in Colorado
Front Range Urban Corridor
North Central Colorado Urban Area
Denver-Aurora-Boulder, CO Combined Statistical Area
Denver-Aurora-Broomfield, CO Metropolitan Statistical Area
Cherry Creek Rockshelter
Franktown Cave, prehistorical archaeological site

References

External links

Franktown @ Colorado.com
Franktown @ UncoverColorado.com
Save Franktown! website
Douglas County website
Douglas County School District

Census-designated places in Douglas County, Colorado
Census-designated places in Colorado
Denver metropolitan area
Former county seats in Colorado